Seoán Ó Máel Fogmair was Bishop of Killala until 25 October 1280.

References

1280 deaths
13th-century Roman Catholic bishops in Ireland
Bishops of Killala
Year of birth unknown